W. B. Smith Whaley House, also known as the Dunbar Funeral Home, is a historic home located at Columbia, South Carolina. It built in 1892–1893, and is a three-story, irregular plan, Queen Anne style frame dwelling. It features a corner turret with conical roof and a long curving enclosed front porch. It was built by W. B. Smith Whaley, president of the Columbia Electric Street Railway and Mill Stable Company. In 1924, it became the Dunbar Funeral Home.

It was added to the National Register of Historic Places in 1979.

References

Houses on the National Register of Historic Places in South Carolina
Queen Anne architecture in South Carolina
Houses completed in 1893
Houses in Columbia, South Carolina
National Register of Historic Places in Columbia, South Carolina